Luhu is an Austronesian spoken in the west of Seram Island in eastern Indonesia. It is spoken in Luhu village on Hoamoal Peninsula at the western end of Seram, and in Boano and Kelang islands, off the western tip of Seram Island.

The northernmost dialect, Piru, was separated from the rest of the language through colonial depopulation, and was influenced by neighboring languages as it became moribund.

References

Central Maluku languages
Languages of Indonesia
Seram Island